Jarden Zinc Products LLC. has been manufacturing continuous casting zinc strip since the late 1800s. The company is a subsidiary of One Rock Capital. The company is most notable for being the sole manufacturer of planchets used in the production of the United States penny. Jarden Zinc is also the manufacturer of the ZincSecure based Ukrainian ₴5 and ₴10 coins.

Products 
The company's largest source of revenue comes from the production of coin blanks, having produced over 300 billion blanks at their Tennessee facility. The company also supplies zinc strips used in various cathodic protection, building, automotive, architectural, and specialty products. Such products include zinc galvanic anodes, LifeJacket, and LifeDowel automotive blade fuses, metal flashing, guttering systems, plumbing hardware, wall cladding, braille, organ pipes, counter tops, signs, and medals among other niche items.

Product development 
Zinc's attributes and characteristics can be manipulated to create new zinc alloys. Jarden Zinc Products has a product development team that is tasked with creating new alloys that meet specific market needs.

References

External links
Official  website

Zinc companies
Manufacturing companies based in Tennessee
Greeneville, Tennessee
Newell Brands
Metal companies of the United States